Operation Madad may refer to:

Operation Madad (Indian Navy), a disaster relief operation undertaken by the Indian Armed Forces in the aftermath of the 2004 Indian Ocean tsunami.
Operation Madad (Pakistan Navy), Pakistan Navy's assistance and SAR operation to support effected areas of Pakistan following the 2010 Pakistan floods.